The Stephan A. Foley House is a historic house located at 427 Tremont St. in Lincoln, Illinois. The house was built in 1898 for Stephan A. Foley, a county judge and prominent local philanthropist. Architect W. A. Otis likely designed the house, a Queen Anne home with Colonial Revival details. The house's irregular shape and its porches and bays are typical of Queen Anne buildings. Colonial Revival elements of the house include its gambrel roofs, Palladian windows, swans neck pediments, and quoins on the corners.

The house was added to the National Register of Historic Places on May 3, 1984.

References

Houses on the National Register of Historic Places in Illinois
Queen Anne architecture in Illinois
Colonial Revival architecture in Illinois
Houses completed in 1898
Houses in Logan County, Illinois
National Register of Historic Places in Logan County, Illinois